Saroj is a given name and a surname. Notable people with the name include:

Given name:
Saroj Raj Choudhury, Indian environmentalist, wildlife conservationist, writer
Saroj Dey (1921–1997), Bengali film director
Saroj Dubey (born 1938), Indian politician
Saroj Nalini Dutt MBE, (1887–1925), Indian feminist and social reformer
Saroj Dutta (1914–1971), Indian communist intellectual and poet
Saroj Ghose, Indian science popularizer and museum maker
Saroj Chooramani Gopal, is an Indian medical doctor, medical educationist, paediatric surgeon
Saroj Khan (1948-2020), one of the most prominent Indian dance choreographers in Hindi cinema
Saroj Khaparde, Indian politician from Maharashtra
Saroj Mukherjee (1911–1990), Indian freedom fighter, member of the Polit Bureau of the Communist Party of India
Gogi Saroj Pal (born 1945), eminent Indian artist
Saroj Pandey (born 1968), politician and member of Bharatiya Janata Party
Saroj Perera (born 1960), Sri Lankan businessman, managing director of DSL Group of Companies
Saroj Silpikul (born 1928), Thai former sports shooter
Saroj Thanasunti, Thai diplomat

Surname:
Daroga Prasad Saroj (born 1956), Indian politician for the Lalganj (Lok Sabha Constituency) in Uttar Pradesh
Kalpana Saroj, female Indian entrepreneur
Santosh Saroj, Bollywood screenwriter and dialogue writer
Sarju Prasad Saroj, Indian politician belonging to the Janata Dal
Shiv Kumar Saroj, announcer with the Hindi Service of Radio Ceylon
Sushila Saroj, member of the 15th Lok Sabha of India
Tufani Saroj (born 1956), Indian politician for the Saidpur (Lok Sabha constituency) in Uttar Pradesh
Vinod Saroj (Born 1 July 1980) is an Indian politician from Bela Pratapgarh, India

See also
Padmasree Bharat Dr. Saroj Kumar, a 2012 Malayalam satirical film
Saroj Mohan Institute of Technology (commonly SMIT), engineering college in Guptipara, West Bengal, India
Saroja (disambiguation)
Sarojini
Sarooj